Natanzi may be,

Natanzi language, Iran
Morteza Saffari Natanzi